Tamghas, also Gulmi Tamghas or Tamghas Bazaar   is the center of Resunga Municipality, and the district headquarter of Gulmi district .

Demographics 
As of 2001 it had a population of 335679

Economy 
Significant cobalt reserves are present in the area. In the 1970s a road was planned between Tamghas and Palpa District.

Geography 
The village of Gulmi Arkhale is located just to the northwest.

Culture 
The major religious place located here is Resunga hill. Notable places of worship in Tamghas are Shivalaya, Bhagawati Mandir, Tamghas Vagawati Mandir and Siddhababa Mandir. In Arjun hill, a cave system serves as a religious place.

Education
Tamghas contains the main educational institutions in Gulmi District, including Adarsha Bidhya Ashram, Arjun Boarding High School, Brilliant United Academy, Gandaki Boarding School, Vujelkharka School, Siddababa Higher Secondary School, Donbosco School, Buddha Lower Secondary School, Resunga Higher Secondary School, Mahendra Higher Secondary School and Reader's Public High School.

Administration 
The district government offices  and the police headquarters is located in the town and the Nepalese Army have a base there.

The town is served by Tamghas Hospital and a Jail.

Media 
FM radio stations Radio Sky - 88.4 MHz and Radio Resunga 106.2 MHz, are local community radio Stations.

References

External links
Video of images

Populated places in Gulmi District